Jiangxi Lushan Football Club is a professional Chinese football club that currently participates in the China League One division under licence from the Chinese Football Association (CFA). The team was founded in Jiujiang, Jiangxi, and their new home stadium is the 31,000 capacity Jiujiang Stadium where they are owned by the Jiujiang Liansheng Group.

History
The club was established as an amateur club named Jiujiang Liansheng (Simplified Chinese: 九江联盛) on 3 April 2002 and was directly named after their owners the Jiujiang Liansheng Group. They played in the amateur leagues for ten years and claimed runners-up in the 2011 China Amateur Football League. On 23 February 2012, the club was reorganized as a professional football club and to represent this the owners changed the club's name to Jiangxi Liansheng to signify the city they would be representing. Their first season as a professional unit saw them enter the third tier of the Chinese football pyramid where in their debut season they finished eighth within their group. After three seasons within the division they won the league and gained promotion to the second tier by beating Taiyuan Zhongyou Jiayi 2–0 in the division final.

In February 2021, the club changed its name to Jiangxi Beidamen. In March 2023, the club changed its name to Jiangxi Lushan.

Name history
2002–2012: Jiujiang Liansheng (九江联盛）
2012–2020: Jiangxi Liansheng (江西联盛)
2021–2022: Jiangxi Beidamen (江西北大门)
2023-:Jiangxi Lushan (江西庐山)

Players

Current squad

Coaching staff

Managerial history

  Gu Mingchang (2012)
  Li Xiao (2013–2014)
  Huang Yan (2015)
  Sun Wei (2015)
  Song Lihui (2016)
  Fan Yuhong (2017)
  Kazimir Vulić (2017–2018)
  Huang Yong (2019–)

Results
All-time league rankings

As of the end of 2019 season.

 in group stage.
 Avoided relegation through play-off.
 6 points deducted due to unpaid salaries.

Key
 Pld = Played
 W = Games won
 D = Games drawn
 L = Games lost
 F = Goals for
 A = Goals against
 Pts = Points
 Pos = Final position

 DNQ = Did not qualify
 DNE = Did not enter
 NH = Not Held
 – = Does Not Exist
 R1 = Round 1
 R2 = Round 2
 R3 = Round 3
 R4 = Round 4

 F = Final
 SF = Semi-finals
 QF = Quarter-finals
 R16 = Round of 16
 Group = Group stage
 GS2 = Second Group stage
 QR1 = First Qualifying Round
 QR2 = Second Qualifying Round
 QR3 = Third Qualifying Round

Club honours
 China League Two
Champions (1): 2014

References

External links
 Official club website 

Football clubs in China
Association football clubs established in 2002
2002 establishments in China